Morgan Morris (born 28 August 1998) is a Welsh rugby union player who plays for Ospreys in the back row.

Career 
Morris was involved with the Ospreys U16 team, before attending Hartpury College, where he was involved with their team, as well as Gloucester U18.

A Wales U20 international, Morris represented the side in the 2017 and 2018 Six Nations Under 20s Championship.

Morris made his debut for the Ospreys in 2018 against Connacht having previously played for the Ospreys academy and Swansea RFC. Morgan began his rugby career at junior level at Penclawdd RFC. Morris is a dynamic ball carrier and a constant breakdown threat, winning Ospreys player of the season in both the 2020/21 and the 21/22 seasons.

On 17 December 2022, Morris was named man of the match in the Ospreys away victory over Montpellier, scoring a try to secure the win.

References

External links 
Ospreys Player Profile

Welsh rugby union players
Ospreys (rugby union) players
Living people
1998 births